Pseudoficimia is a genus of snake in the family Colubridae  that contains the sole species Pseudoficimia frontalis. It is commonly known as the False ficimia.

It is found in Mexico.

References 

Colubrids
Monotypic snake genera
Reptiles described in 1864
Reptiles of Mexico